Hanthawaddy International Airport is an international airport currently under construction in Bago Region, Myanmar that is located about  away from Yangon. The project was started in 2001  but it was subsequently halted.

Myanmar's government have announced their plan to restart the project in 2012 to meet their future developments. A consortium led by Incheon International Airport Corporation (IIAC), including South Korean firms (Halla Engineering & Construction Corporation, Lotte Engineering & Construction Corporation, POSCO ICT and Kumho Industrial Company) was awarded the US$1.1 billion contract, to build the new airport and operate the airport for 50 years. The airport will have the capacity to handle 12 million passengers per year and expected to be start operation by 2018.  Due to financial related issue and disagreement over passenger capacity, however, the deal with the Incheon consortium was terminated and a new tender was reopened in February 2014.

The new tender was awarded to a Singapore-Japan consortium on 29 October 2014. The consortium comprises Singapore's Yongnam Holdings, Changi Airport Planners and Engineers, a subsidiary of Changi Airport Group  and Japan's JGC Corporation. The contract is worth $1.45 billion and the consortium will get official development assistance from the Japanese government for up to 49 percent of the total contract. The rest of the funding will come from private lending ($517 million) and investments from the consortium ($222 million). The completion date is now pushed back to 2022.

See also
Yangon International Airport
Naypyidaw Airport
Mandalay International Airport

References

Airports in Myanmar
JGC Corporation